Adult standards is a North American radio format heard primarily on AM or class A FM stations.

Adult standards (also sometimes known as the nostalgia format) is aimed at "mature" adults, meaning mainly those people over 50 years of age, but it is mostly targeted for senior citizens. It is primarily on AM because market research reveals that only persons in that age group listen to music on AM in sizable numbers. Adult standards first became a popular format in the late 1970s and early 1980s as a way to reach mature adults who came of age before the rock era but were perhaps too mature for adult contemporary radio or too young for beautiful music or MOR stations. A typical adult standards playlist includes traditional pop music by artists such as Frank Sinatra and Tony Bennett, some easy listening numbers from Roger Whittaker and others, and softer tunes from the oldies and adult contemporary music formats; as originally conceived, the format also features big band music, particularly from the 1940s and 1950s, though most modern stations eschew that genre. Younger artists who record in the big-band era style, such as Harry Connick Jr., or Diana Krall, may be played as well. The term "standards" in the format's title is a reference to the standard, a song that is covered extensively by many artists over a prolonged period of time; adult standards may play true standards but are not limited to them.

At one time there were several hundred such stations, a number that declined to approximately 200 as of 2012 and fewer than 30 in 2020. Because the adult standards audience has increased in age to the point where many of its listeners have either died or are no longer attractive to advertisers, the format as it is known today (much like the contemporary decline of oldies and smooth jazz formats, along with the earlier demise of easy listening) is likely to die out. Most independently programmed former adult standards stations have transitioned to other formats such as oldies, classic hits, or adult contemporary music that have similar music but skew toward more modern songs.

Satellite delivered formats
Only about a handful of adult standards stations today are live and locally programmed around-the-clock. Many have affiliated with nationally distributed satellite formats to cut costs; due to advertiser perceptions about the audiences these stations primarily target, a large number of adult standards stations have trouble selling airtime to advertisers, which makes them unprofitable. For example, KIXI 880 AM, serving the Seattle market and KKIN 930 AM, serving Aitkin, terminated its local airstaff to affiliate with the Music of Your Life network. Many others have simply dumped the format altogether, often for all-talk or all-sports formats, oldies, or other formats deemed by management more profitable than standards.

Music of Your Life is an adult standards format that probably more than any other source defined the format. Music of Your Life, was founded by Al Ham in 1978 and boasts a roster of well-known personalities including Peter Marshall, Steve March-Torme, son of the legendary crooner, Mel Tormé, big band leader Les Brown, Jr., radio veteran Al Hardee, Lorri Hafer, daughter of founder Al Ham, and weekend host Pat Boone. Following an internal shakeup in 2008, business developer, Marc Angell took over the fledgling network and moved the company's broadcasting operations to Denver, Colorado, under a distribution deal with Clear Channel Satellite. Music of Your Life is currently distributed by Music of Your Life, Inc. a publicly traded company listed on the OTC markets under the ticker symbol, MYLI, and is distributed to AM, FM, and HD radio stations using the Barix system.

Dial Global (formerly part of Westwood One) has an adult standards format distributed via satellite; Dial Global's is called "Adult Standards" (known on-air as "America's Best Music"). Prior to 2010, ABC distributed Stardust/Timeless Classics/Timeless. Stardust/Timeless Classics was consolidated with a middle-of-the-road format owned by ABC—Unforgettable Favorites/Memories—in 2006, creating Timeless. Westwood One originally called its format AM Only and for a time, as the name suggests, offered the format only to AM stations; today, a handful of FM stations also air Westwood One's format.

While Music of Your Life has not eliminated all of the big-band and traditional pop music from its playlist, Westwood One and ABC dropped much of the older music in favor of softer pop and rock oldies from the 1960s and 1970s top 40 era and a good deal of soft AC material as well. Under Dial Global, some of the older-style songs are making a comeback on the Westwood One format. ABC discontinued its Timeless service early in 2010; that same year, Music of Your Life added more 1960s oldies to its playlist.

iHeartMedia's Format Lab also features at least two adult standards formats.

Adult standards terrestrial stations 
Some noteworthy AM & FM radio stations featuring the adult standards format today include:

Satellite radio
Moving into the 21st Century, adult standards have been given a lift as a format by new media, such as:
 Sirius XM Channel 5, The 50s on 5, playing some older pre-rock-and-roll-era music along with some newer rock-and-roll hits from the late 1950s and early 1960s.
 Sirius XM Radio 70, Siriusly Sinatra (formerly entitled Standard Time before February 2007)
 XM Satellite Radio 40s Junction, XM Satellite Radio Channel 73

See also 
 Adult contemporary music
 Beautiful music
 Middle of the road
 Pop standards
 Traditional pop music

Radio formats